National Highway 309B, commonly referred to as NH 309B is a national highway in  India. It is a spur road of National Highway 9. NH-309B traverses the state of Uttarakhand in India.

Route 
Almora - Panar near Rameshwar.

Junctions  

  Terminal near Almora.
  at Panar near Rameshwar.

See also 

 List of National Highways in India
 List of National Highways in India by state

References

External links 

 NH 309B on OpenStreetMap

National highways in India
National Highways in Uttarakhand